Leucauge lamperti, is a species of spider of the genus Leucauge. It is endemic to Sri Lanka.

See also
 List of Tetragnathidae species

References

lamperti
Endemic fauna of Sri Lanka
Spiders of Asia
Spiders described in 1907